Brigham Young (also known as Brigham Young – Frontiersman) is a 1940 American biographical western film starring Tyrone Power, Linda Darnell and Dean Jagger that describes Young's succession to the presidency of the Church of Jesus Christ of Latter-day Saints after founder Joseph Smith was assassinated in 1844. The supporting cast features Brian Donlevy, Jane Darwell, John Carradine, Mary Astor, Vincent Price and Tully Marshall.

Plot
The story begins in frontier-town Nauvoo, Illinois, in 1844. It follows the main body of the church as they are forced to leave Illinois, choosing to settle temporarily in Nebraska and then to travel by wagon train to the Great Basin. Much of the story's plot revolves around two of the group, Jonathan Kent and Zina Webb.

Cast
 Tyrone Power as Jonathan Kent
 Linda Darnell as Zina Webb – The Outsider
 Dean Jagger as Brigham Young
 Brian Donlevy as Angus Duncan
 Jane Darwell as Eliza Kent
 John Carradine as Porter Rockwell
 Mary Astor as Mary Ann Young
 Vincent Price as Joseph Smith
 Jean Rogers as Clara Young
 Ann E. Todd as Mary Kent
 Willard Robertson as Heber Kimball
 Moroni Olsen as Doc Richards
 Marc Lawrence as Prosecutor
 Stanley Andrews as Hyrum Smith
 Dickie Jones as Henry Kent
 Selmer Jackson as Caleb Kent 
 Arthur Aylesworth as Jim Bridger 
 Chief John Big Tree as Big Elk 
 Claire Du Brey as Emma Smith
 Tully Marshall as Judge 
 Dick Rich as 1st Mob Leader 
 Edwin Maxwell as 2nd Mob Leader
 George Melford as John Taylor
 Russell Simpson as U.S. Army Major 
 Tom London as Raider (uncredited) 
 Charles Middleton as Mob Member (uncredited)

Production
Parts of the film were shot in Lone Pine, California, in the plains west of Parowan Gap, and in Utah Lake for the seagull scenes. The Salt Lake City sequences were filmed in California, while the trek across Nebraska and Wyoming was shot in southern Utah.

Reception
Michael and Henry Medved included Brigham Young in their 1984 book describing film financial failures, The Hollywood Hall of Shame, stating "Twentieth Century-Fox tried to emphasize its star power and to downplay the religious elements (eventually re-titling it Brigham Young, Frontiersman), but the picture still failed, even in Utah."

See also
 List of American films of 1940
 George D. Pyper

References

External links
 
 
 
 
 Brigham Young Souvenir Program Reprint. MSS SC 388; 20th Century Western and Mormon Manuscripts; L. Tom Perry Special Collections, Harold B. Lee Library, Brigham Young University.

1940 films
1940 romantic drama films
1940 Western (genre) films
1940s biographical films
20th Century Fox films
American Western (genre) films
American biographical films
American black-and-white films
American romantic drama films
Biographical films about politicians
Young, Brigham
Cultural depictions of Brigham Young
Cultural depictions of Joseph Smith
1940s English-language films
Films about Mormonism
Films about the California Gold Rush
Films directed by Henry Hathaway
Films produced by Darryl F. Zanuck
Films scored by Alfred Newman
Films set in 1844
Films set in Illinois
Films set in Iowa
Films set in Utah
Films set in the 1840s
Films set in the 19th century
Films shot in California
Films shot in Los Angeles
Films shot in Utah
Films with screenplays by Lamar Trotti
1940s American films